The Divorce (Insanity and Desertion) Act 1958 was an Act of the Parliament of the United Kingdom that modified the law relating to divorce to widen the definition of insanity and alleviate any hardships caused by the ability to divorce on the ground of desertion, as introduced in Matrimonial Causes Act 1937. The Act was based on the recommendations of Royal Commission on Marriage and Divorce, and was introduced immediately after receiving the Royal Assent on 23 July 1958.

Under divorce law at the time, anybody could receive "relief" if their spouse had been voluntarily treated for mental illness for at least five years. The Act amended this section of the Matrimonial Causes Act 1950 to remove the need for this treatment to come after a period of being forcibly detained. Section 2 of the Act says that once the desertion begins, the courts may find that it is continuing even if the person who deserted is not capable of continuing to make that decision — for example, if he was insane. This removes the defence of "supervening insanity", as seen in the leading case of Crowther v Crowther. The Act was repealed by the Matrimonial Causes Act 1965.

References

Bibliography

United Kingdom Acts of Parliament 1958
Repealed United Kingdom Acts of Parliament
Divorce law in the United Kingdom